12 Rounds is a 2009 American action film directed by Renny Harlin and produced by WWE Studios. The cast is led by John Cena, alongside Aidan Gillen, Steve Harris, Gonzalo Menendez, Brian J. White, Ashley Scott, and Taylor Cole. The film was released to theaters in the United States on March 27, 2009.

Plot
A sting operation to capture arms dealer Miles Jackson goes awry when the FBI's inside man double crosses them. Miles escapes with his girlfriend Erica Kessen in a getaway car. Officers Danny Fisher and Hank Carver help the FBI. They find a surveillance video of Miles dancing with Kessen. A subsequent encounter at a traffic light leads to her death and Miles being taken away. Miles swears vengeance on Fisher.

One year later, Miles escapes from prison and calls Fisher, who is now a Detective. Fisher is injured when his car and house explode. After recovery, Jackson forces Fisher in a game of revenge called "12 Rounds". The explosions were "Round 1". Fisher's girlfriend Molly is kidnapped for "Round 2". For "Round 3", Fisher follows clues to locate the cell phone
For "Round 4" Fisher goes to New Orleans Savings and Loans and extracts two security deposit boxes within 20 minutes in middle of fire.

While Fisher continues with the game, his friend Carver looks into Molly's kidnapping. FBI Agents work with them as well.

Round after round, Fisher keeps progressing and barely making it ahead.

Fisher ultimately understands that the rounds were rigged from the start. The inevitable death in the elevator was also orchestrated by Jackson. All events turn out to be connected. They figure out that Jackson was leading them to take out the power because Homewood Security comes in to move the federally unprotected cash from the United States Mint in New Orleans. Jackson's grudge against Fisher was only a cover for his scheme to steal this money.

Fisher realizes that "Round 12" is a wild-goose chase. Jackson, dressed as a security guard, steals the cash. He uses Porter's ID card to get to a Medevac chopper on a hospital roof, transporting the money inside a body bag. Fisher and Aiken race to the hospital roof, where Aiken is wounded. Jackson activates the touch phone-bomb and throws the switch away. Porter and Fisher jump into a pool, while Jackson is left in the exploding helicopter. The movie ends with Danny and Molly leaving, with Molly wanting to go home, but Danny tells her about what happened to it.

Cast

 John Cena as Danny Fisher
 Ashley Scott as Molly Porter
 Aidan Gillen as Miles Jackson
 Brian J. White as Hank Carver
 Taylor Cole as Erica Kessen
 Vincent Flood as Detective Chuck Jansen
 Steve Harris as George Aiken
 Gonzalo Menendez as Ray Santiago
 Travis Davis as Anthony Deluso
 Kyle Clements as Dave Fisher
 Billy Slaughter as Technician
 Peter "Navy" Tuiasosopo as Willie Dumaine

Music
The score of 12 Rounds was composed by Trevor Rabin, who had previously worked with director Renny Harlin on Deep Blue Sea and Exorcist: The Beginning. He recorded his score with the Hollywood Studio Symphony at the Eastwood Scoring Stage at Warner Bros. Studios.

Soundtrack
 "Feel You" – Crumbland
 "Ready to Fall" – Rise Against
 "12 Rounds Suite" – Trevor Rabin

Reception

Box office
The filmed opened at number seven at the box office, gaining an estimate of $1.75 million in its opening day and $5.3 million in its opening weekend. The film grossed $12,234,694 in the United States and Canada, and $5,045,632 in other territories, for a worldwide total of $17,280,326.

Critical response

12 Rounds has received mostly negative reviews from critics. Some critics have noted the film's similarities to the 1995 film Die Hard with a Vengeance. On Rotten Tomatoes the film has an approval rating of 30% based on reviews from 71 critics. The site's consensus reads: "Energetic but empty, 12 Rounds''' preposterous plot hurtles along at a rapid pace, but can't disguise the derivative script". On Metacritic, the film has a weighted average score of 38%, based on 13 reviews. Audiences surveyed by CinemaScore gave the film a grade of B−.

Rob Nelson of Variety wrote that the film is heavy on stunts but light on plausibility, humor, surprise, visual ingenuity or psychological depth.
Nathan Rabin of The A.V. Club called the film "honest trash: it never pretends to be anything other than manic schlock" and gave it a grade C+.

Home media12 Rounds was released on DVD, Blu-ray Disc, and UMD with an unrated "Extreme Cut" of the film on June 30, 2009. In the first week, 12 Rounds opened at #1 at the DVD sales chart, selling 208,936 DVD units translating to revenue of $3.1m. As of July 2011, 581,834 DVD units have been sold, bringing in $8,884,292 in revenue. This does not include Blu-ray Disc sales/DVD rentals.

Sequels
Randy Orton stars in a stand-alone sequel titled 12 Rounds 2: Reloaded. The sequel was released in 2013. 12 Rounds 3: Lockdown'' starring Dean Ambrose was released in 2015.

References

External links
 
 
 
 Media information

2009 films
2009 action films
20th Century Fox films
2000s English-language films
American action films
Fictional portrayals of the New Orleans Police Department
Films about kidnapping in the United States
Films directed by Renny Harlin
Films scored by Trevor Rabin
Films shot in New Orleans
American police detective films
WWE Studios films
2000s police procedural films
12 Rounds films
20th Century Studios franchises
2000s American films